Karel Kaplan (28 August 1928 – 12 March 2023) was a Czech historian. He specialized in the World War II and post-World War II periods in Czechoslovakia. He wrote books about Czech political trials during the 1950s, the situation of Jews in Central Europe during World War II, and the Communist takeover in Czechoslovakia.

Biography 
Kaplan was born in Horní Jelení in 1928. During the Prague Spring in 1968, he worked for the Committee of Rehabilitation where he was able to access classified documents of the Czechoslovak Communist Party. After the end of Prague Spring, Kaplan fell into disfavor. He worked in a factory from 1972 to 1976, and in 1976 asked for political asylum in Munich. After his exile he published documents on secret Soviet activities, which were serialised in the Italian magazine Panorama. Kaplan claimed he had discovered files that described a secret meeting in the Kremlin in January 1951, where Joseph Stalin announced his plan for a war with the United States within three or four years, with the aim of driving the Americans out of Europe. In 1990 Kaplan went back to Czechoslovakia and continued his academic research in Prague.

Kaplan died on 12 March 2023, at age 94.

Selected translated works 
 Dans les Archives du Comité Central: Trente ans de secrets du bloc soviétique, 1978, .
 The Short March: The Communist takeover in Czechoslovakia 1945-1948, 1987, .
 Report on the Murder of the General Secretary, April 1990
 Zpráva o zavraždění generálního tajemníka, 1992 (in Czech)

References

External links
 Memory of nations: Karel Kaplan
 Karel Kaplan: Přibližovat se k pravdě at Czech Radio 
 Kronikář komunistického Československa. Karel Kaplan a studium soudobých dějin (A Chronicler of Communist Czechoslovakia: Karel Kaplan and Contemporary History), Contemporary History (02/2008)

1928 births
2023 deaths
20th-century Czech historians
21st-century Czech historians
Recipients of Medal of Merit (Czech Republic)
Czechoslovak defectors
People from Pardubice District
Historians of communism
Communist Party of Czechoslovakia members
Czechoslovak expatriates in West Germany